Chorfa is a town and commune in Mascara Province, Algeria. The population in 2002 was 14,850.

References

Communes of Mascara Province
Mascara Province